Pirates of the Caribbean: The Curse of the Black Pearl is a 2003 American supernatural swashbuckler film directed by Gore Verbinski and the first film in the Pirates of the Caribbean film series. Produced by Walt Disney Pictures and Jerry Bruckheimer, the film is based on Walt Disney's Pirates of the Caribbean attraction at Disney theme parks. The story follows pirate Jack Sparrow (Johnny Depp) and blacksmith Will Turner (Orlando Bloom) as they rescue the kidnapped Elizabeth Swann (Keira Knightley) from the cursed crew of the Black Pearl, captained by Hector Barbossa (Geoffrey Rush), who become undead skeletons in moonlight.

Jay Wolpert developed a script in 2001, and Stuart Beattie rewrote it in early 2002. Around that time, producer Jerry Bruckheimer became involved in the project; he had Ted Elliott and Terry Rossio work on the script, adding the plot device of a supernatural curse to the story to bring it in line with the original theme park ride. Filming took place from October 2002 to March 2003 in Saint Vincent and the Grenadines and on sets constructed around Los Angeles, California.

The first film released under the Walt Disney Pictures banner to be rated PG-13 by the MPAA, The Curse of the Black Pearl had its world premiere at Disneyland Park in Anaheim, California, on June 28, 2003. Defying low pre-release expectations, the film was a huge box-office success, grossed $654.3 million worldwide; making it the fourth-highest-grossing film of 2003. It received generally positive reviews from critics, with Depp's performance receiving universal acclaim. The film has been widely cited as the film that launched Depp as a box-office leading man after many years as a cult movie star. Depp won the Screen Actors Guild Award for Outstanding Performance by a Male Actor in a Leading Role, in addition to Best Actor nominations at the Academy Awards, BAFTAs, and Golden Globes. The Curse of the Black Pearl was also nominated for four other Academy Awards and BAFTAs. The film became the first in a franchise, and was followed by four sequels: Dead Man's Chest (2006), At World's End (2007), On Stranger Tides (2011), and Dead Men Tell No Tales (2017).

Plot

In 1720, while sailing to Port Royal, Jamaica, aboard HMS Dauntless, Governor Weatherby Swann's crew encounters a shipwreck and recovers a boy, Will Turner. Swann's daughter, Elizabeth, discovers a golden pirate medallion around Will's neck, and takes it. Eight years later, Captain James Norrington is promoted to commodore and proposes to Elizabeth. Her corset makes her faint and fall into the sea, causing the medallion to emit a pulse. Captain Jack Sparrow, having just arrived in Port Royal to commandeer a ship, rescues Elizabeth. Norrington identifies Jack as a pirate, and a chase ensues. Jack encounters Will, now a blacksmith. They duel, and Jack is imprisoned.

That night, the crew of the Black Pearl attacks Port Royal, searching for the medallion. The pirates capture Elizabeth, taking her to meet Captain Barbossa. Elizabeth claims her last name is Turner, to conceal her identity as the governor's daughter. Barbossa explains that the medallion is the last of 882 gold pieces his crew took from a lost treasure of Hernán Cortés on Isla de Muerta. Cortés had accepted the treasure as payment to prevent the Fall of Tenochtitlan, but did not fulfill his part of the bargain. The Aztec gods cursed the treasure; Barbossa and any members of his crew who took the coins were cursed and became undead who can only feel endless hunger and pain whose true, skeletal forms are revealed in moonlight. To lift the curse, they must return the treasure, each coin stained with either its taker's blood or the blood of the taker's direct relative. Assuming Elizabeth is the daughter of Bill Turner (whom Barbossa tries to drown after discovering he sent the medallion to his child), Barbossa decides to use her blood on the medallion.

To save Elizabeth, whom he loves, Will frees Jack, who was the previous captain of the Black Pearl before Barbossa staged a mutiny. The two commandeer HMS Interceptor, a small sloop-of-war, and head for Tortuga. There, Jack enlists his friend Joshamee Gibbs to help them assemble a crew. Chasing the Pearl to the Isla de Muerta, Will and Jack witness Barbossa cut Elizabeth's hand, stain the coin, and return it to the chest. As she is not Bill Turner's relative, the curse does not lift. Will rescues Elizabeth and brings her to the Interceptor, while Jack is captured by Barbossa and locked in the brig of the Pearl. The Pearl pursues the Interceptor, destroying it and taking Jack's crew hostage. Realizing that it is him Barbossa wants, Will makes a deal with Barbossa to release Elizabeth in exchange for his blood, but Barbossa exploits a loophole in the agreement, marooning Jack and Elizabeth on an island. Elizabeth makes a smoke signal, and Norrington brings the Dauntless to rescue Elizabeth and arrest Jack. Elizabeth promises to marry Norrington if he will pursue the Pearl and save Will.

That night, the Dauntless arrives at Isla de Muerta. Jack tells Norrington he will lure the pirates out to be ambushed by the crew of the Dauntless, but instead persuades Barbossa's crew to attack the Dauntless before they lift the curse and lose their immortality. Elizabeth escapes the Dauntless and frees Jack's crew from the brig of the Pearl. They refuse to rescue Jack and Will, so Elizabeth sets out on her own. Jack again switches sides, freeing Will and dueling Barbossa, while Elizabeth and Will fight off Barbossa's crewmen. When Barbossa stabs Jack, it is revealed that Jack took a piece of gold from the chest and is likewise cursed and unable to die. Jack shoots Barbossa, and Will returns both coins to the chest with his and Jack's blood on them. The curse is lifted; Barbossa dies from Jack's gunshot, and the rest of Barbossa's crew, no longer immortal, are arrested.

At Port Royal, Jack is to be hanged for piracy. Elizabeth diverts Norrington's attention while Will attempts a rescue, but Jack and Will are surrounded. Elizabeth intercedes and declares her love for Will. Governor Swann pardons Will and gives his blessing for Elizabeth to marry him. Jack dives into the sea and escapes aboard the nearby Pearl, reclaiming the ship and his new crew. Norrington permits Jack and the Pearl "one day's head start" before initiating pursuit.

Cast

 Johnny Depp as Jack Sparrow: An eccentric and trickster pirate characterized by his slightly drunken swagger, slurred speech and awkwardly flailing hand gestures. He has gained a reputation with made-up stories of how he escaped from the deserted island he was put on. He is determined to regain the Black Pearl, which he captained ten years before. The role was originally written especially for Hugh Jackman, thus the name "Jack Sparrow"; however, he was not well known outside of his native Australia, so Disney cast the more famous Depp as Jack.<ref>McKay, Holly (2010, December 1. "Jack Sparrow Was Named After Hugh Jackman, Not Intended for Johnny Depp" Fox News. Retrieved on December 2, 2010.</ref> Depp found the script quirky: rather than trying to find treasure, the crew of the Black Pearl were trying to return it in order to lift their curse; also, the traditional mutiny had already taken place. Initially Sparrow was, according to Bruckheimer, "a young Burt Lancaster, just the cocky pirate." At the first read-through, Depp surprised the rest of the cast and crew by portraying the character in an off-kilter manner. After researching 18th-century pirates, Depp compared them to modern rock stars and decided to base his performance on Keith Richards, who would appear as Jack's father in the third film. Although Verbinski and Bruckheimer had confidence in Depp, partly because it would be Bloom who was playing the traditional Errol Flynn type, Disney executives were confused, asking Depp whether the character was drunk or gay, and Michael Eisner at one point proclaimed, "He's ruining the film!" Even Bruckheimer "was slightly uncomfortable" with Depp's decision to actually cap his teeth with gold. Depp later recalled, "I said, 'Look, these are the choices I made. You know my work. So either trust me or give me the boot.' And luckily, they didn't."
 Geoffrey Rush as Captain Barbossa: The captain of the Black Pearl, he was Captain Jack Sparrow's first mate before he led a mutiny ten years before. He and his crew stole cursed Aztec gold, for which they are cursed to walk the earth forever. Barbossa was conceptualized as a villain, as a "dark trickster" and evil counterpart to Jack Sparrow, Johnny Depp created the name "Hector Barbossa" on set though the name was never revealed onscreen. Verbinski approached Rush for the role of Barbossa, as he knew he would not play it with attempts at complexity, but with a simple villainy that would suit the story's tone. Contrarily, Rush felt that he was playing the unsung hero of the film, who only dreamed about lifting the curse and living as a rich rogue with his prized pirate bride and developed an intricate backstory for the character to play him more convincingly. Originally, Rush was only second choice for the role behind Robert De Niro, who turned it down as he expected the film to flop like previous pirate films did.
 Orlando Bloom as Will Turner: A blacksmith's apprentice working in Port Royal, he is in love with Elizabeth Swann. Will struggles with the fact his father, "Bootstrap" Bill, was a pirate, unable to reconcile that he was a good man too. Tobey Maguire, Jude Law, Ewan McGregor, Ben Peyton, Christian Bale and Heath Ledger were considered for the role. Tom Hiddleston auditioned for the role. Bloom read the script after Geoffrey Rush, whom he was working with on Ned Kelly, suggested it to him.
 Keira Knightley as Elizabeth Swann: The daughter of Governor Weatherby Swann, Elizabeth has been fascinated with pirates since childhood. During the Black Pearl attack on Port Royal, she gives her name as Turner and is mistaken for "Bootstrap" Bill's child. She also is in love with Will Turner. Knightley came as a surprise to Verbinski; he had not seen her performance in Bend It Like Beckham and was impressed by her audition.
 Jack Davenport as Norrington: An officer in the Royal Navy who is in love with Elizabeth and has a deep-seated dislike for pirates. The character was only named "Norrington" in the film, whereas his first name "James" was only revealed in a deleted scene. He first served as Lieutenant aboard HMS Dauntless in the beginning, then was a Captain promoted to Commodore for the remainder of the film.
 Kevin R. McNally as Joshamee Gibbs: Jack Sparrow's loyal first mate. The name "Joshamee Gibbs" only appeared in the credits, while only his last name was named onscreen. He was once a sailor for the Royal Navy, serving under Lieutenant Norrington aboard HMS Dauntless, and is the one who tells Will about the mutiny against Jack Sparrow as well as the pirate's marooning and legendary escape.
 Zoe Saldana as Anamaria: A female pirate who signs up to join Will Turner and Mr. Gibbs for a chance to confront Jack Sparrow for stealing her ship. He promises her the Interceptor in an attempt to assuage her. Screenwriter Terry Rossio confirmed that the name was chosen simply because "AnaMaria" is the middle name of his daughter.
 Jonathan Pryce as Governor Weatherby Swann: father of Elizabeth Swann and Governor of Port Royal, Jamaica. Tom Wilkinson was negotiated with to play the part, but the role went to Pryce, whom Depp idolized.
 Treva Etienne as Koehler: A member of Barbossa's cursed crew aboard the Black Pearl. Among other roles in the film, he is one of the pirates who visits Jack Sparrow in his prison cell and is later killed by Commodore Norrington.
 David Bailie as Cotton: A member of Jack's crew. He is introduced as a sailor who is mute because he had his tongue cut out and now has a parrot to talk for him.
 Lee Arenberg as Pintel: A member of Barbossa's cursed crew aboard the Black Pearl. Along with Ragetti, Pintel provides the majority of the comic relief for the pirate side of the story. He says "Hello poppet" to Elizabeth, a line used in later films, as well as has an issue whenever someone says "parley".
 Mackenzie Crook as Ragetti: A member of Barbossa's cursed crew aboard the Black Pearl. Along with Pintel, Ragetti provides the majority of the comic relief for the pirate side of the story. He has a wooden eye that never seems to stay in place.
 Trevor Goddard as Grapple: A member of Barbossa's cursed crew aboard the Black Pearl. This was Goddard's last on-screen appearance before his death.
 Isaac C. Singleton, Jr. as Bo'sun: A member of Barbossa's cursed crew aboard the Black Pearl.
 Brye Cooper as Mallott, a member of Barbossa's cursed crew aboard the Black Pearl.

Supporting characters appearing in the film include Martin Klebba as Marty, a dwarf pirate; Damian O'Hare as Lt. Gillette; Greg Ellis as Officer; as well as Giles New and Angus Barnett as Murtogg and Mullroy. Although characters like Marty only had a single line of dialogue in the film, each of these characters reprise their roles in the Pirates sequels, respectively.

Production
Development
During the early 1990s, screenwriters Ted Elliott and Terry Rossio began to think of a supernatural spin on the pirate genre. Walt Disney Pictures had Jay Wolpert write a script based on the ride in 2001, which was based on a story created by the executives Brigham Taylor, Michael Haynes, and Josh Harmon. This story featured Will Turner as a prison guard who releases Sparrow to rescue Elizabeth, who is being held for ransom money by Captain Blackheart.

Disney was unsure whether to release the film in theaters or direct-to-video. The studio was interested in Matthew McConaughey as Sparrow because of his resemblance to Burt Lancaster, who had inspired that script's interpretation of the character. If they chose to release it direct-to-video, Christopher Walken or Cary Elwes would have been their first choices.

Stuart Beattie was brought in to rewrite the script in March 2002, because of his knowledge of piracy. When Dick Cook managed to convince producer Jerry Bruckheimer to join the project, he rejected the script because it was "a straight pirate movie." Later in March 2002, he brought Elliott and Rossio, who suggested making a supernatural curse—as described in the opening narration of the ride—the film's plot.

In May 2002, Gore Verbinski signed on to direct Pirates of the Caribbean. He was attracted to the idea of using modern technology to resurrect a genre that had disappeared after the Golden Age of Hollywood and recalled his childhood memories of the ride, feeling the film was an opportunity to pay tribute to the "scary and funny" tone of it.

Jim Carrey was considered for the part of Jack Sparrow. However, the production schedule for The Curse of the Black Pearl conflicted with Bruce Almighty. Others considered for the role include Michael Keaton and Christopher Walken. Although Cook had been a strong proponent of adapting Disney's rides into films, the box-office failure of The Country Bears (2002) made Michael Eisner attempt to shut down production of Pirates of the Caribbean. However, Verbinski told his concept artists to keep working on the picture, and when Eisner came to visit, the executive was astonished by what had been created.

As recalled in the book DisneyWar, Eisner asked "Why does it have to cost so much?" Bruckheimer replied, "Your competition is spending $150 million," referring to franchises like The Lord of the Rings and The Matrix. Eisner concurred, but with the stigma attached to theme-park adaptations, Eisner requested Verbinski and Bruckheimer remove some of the more overt references to the ride in the script, such as a scene where Sparrow and Turner enter the cave via a waterfall.

Influence of the Monkey Island series of games
Ted Elliott was allegedly writing a George Lucas-produced animated film adaptation of The Curse of Monkey Island, which was cancelled before its official announcement, three years prior to the release of The Curse of the Black Pearl. This film was allegedly in production at Industrial Light and Magic before being cancelled.

Ron Gilbert, the creator of the Monkey Island series, has jokingly expressed a bitterness towards Pirates of the Caribbean, specifically the second film, for its similarities to his game. Gilbert has also stated that On Stranger Tides, a novel by Tim Powers which was adapted into the fourth film, was the principal source of inspiration for his video games.

Filming and design
Verbinski did not want an entirely romanticized feel to the film: he wanted a sense of historical fantasy. Most of the actors wore prosthetics and contact lenses. Depp had contacts that acted as sunglasses, while Rush and Lee Arenberg wore dulled contacts that gave a sinister feel to the characters. Mackenzie Crook wore two contacts to represent his character's wooden eye: a soft version, and a harder version for when it protrudes. In addition, their rotten teeth and scurvy skin were dyed on, although Depp did have gold teeth added, which he forgot to remove after filming. Depp also used a genuine pistol which was made in 1760 in London, which the crew bought from a dealer in Connecticut. A number of swords were built for the production by blacksmith Tony Swatton. The crew spent five months creating the cavern in which Barbossa and the Black Pearl crew attempt to reverse their curse, filling it with five feet of water, 882 Aztec coins, and some gold paint on the styrofoam rocks for more impressions of treasure. The crew also built the fortress at Port Royal in Rancho Palos Verdes, California, and Governor Swann's palace was built at Manhattan Beach. A fire broke out in September 2002, causing $525,000 worth of damage, though no one was injured.

The filmmakers chose St. Vincent as their primary shooting location, as it contained the quietest beach they could find, and built three piers and a backlot for Port Royal and Tortuga. Of most importance to the film were the three ships: Black Pearl, Dauntless, and Interceptor. For budget reasons, the ships were built on docks, with only six days spent in the open sea for the battle between Black Pearl and Interceptor. Dauntless and Black Pearl were built on barges, with computer-generated imagery finishing the structures. Black Pearl was also built on the Spruce Goose stage, in order to control fog and lighting. Interceptor was a re-dressed , a full-scale replica sailing ship from Aberdeen, Washington, fully repainted before going on a 40-day voyage beginning December 2, 2002, arriving on location on January 12, 2003. A miniature was also built for the storm sequence.

Principal photography began on October 9, 2002, and wrapped by March 7, 2003. The quick shoot was only marred by two accidents: as Jack Sparrow steals Interceptor, three of the ropes attaching it to Dauntless did not break at first, and when they did snap, debris hit Depp's knee, though he was not injured, and the way the incident played out on film made it look like Sparrow merely ducks. A more humorous accident was when the boat Sparrow was supposed to arrive in at Port Royal sank. In October, the crew was shooting scenes at Rancho Palos Verdes, by December they were shooting at Saint Vincent and the Grenadines, and in January they were at the cavern set at Los Angeles. The script often changed with Elliott and Rossio on set, with additions such as Gibbs (Kevin McNally) telling Will how Sparrow allegedly escaped from an island—strapping two turtles together with rope made of his back hair—and Pryce was written into the climactic battle to keep some empathy for the audience.

Because of the quick schedule of the shoot, Industrial Light & Magic immediately began visual effects work. While the skeletal forms of the pirates revealed by moonlight take up relatively little screentime, the crew knew their computer-generated forms had to convince in terms of replicating performances and characteristics of the actors, or else the transition would not work. Each scene featuring them was shot twice: a reference plate with the actors, and then without them to add in the skeletons, an aesthetic complicated by Verbinski's decision to shoot the battles with handheld cameras. The actors also had to perform their scenes again on the motion capture stage. With the shoot only wrapping up four months before release, Verbinski spent 18-hour days on the edit, while at the same time spending time on 600 effects shots, 250 of which were merely removing modern sailboats from shots.

Music

The film score was composed by Klaus Badelt, while Hans Zimmer served as music producer. Seven other composers, including Geoff Zanelli, who later went on to compose the score for Pirates of the Caribbean: Dead Men Tell No Tales and Ramin Djawadi, are credited for "additional music". Verbinski oversaw the score with Badelt and Zimmer, who headed 15 composers to finish it quickly.

Composer Alan Silvestri, who had collaborated with Verbinski on Mouse Hunt and The Mexican, was originally hired to write the score for The Curse of the Black Pearl. However, due to creative differences between the producer Jerry Bruckheimer and him, Silvestri left the project before recording any material. Verbinski and Bruckheimer decided to go with Hans Zimmer's team instead, who were frequent collaborators of their productions. Verbinski asked Hans Zimmer, with whom he had worked on The Ring, to step in. Zimmer declined to do the bulk of the composing, as he was busy scoring The Last Samurai, a project during which he claimed he had promised not to take any other assignments. As a result, he referred Verbinski to Klaus Badelt, a relatively new composer who had been a part of Remote Control Productions (known as Media Ventures at the time) for three years.

The song Elizabeth Swann sings in the opening of the film as a child, and then later on the island marooned with Jack Sparrow, is called Yo Ho (A Pirate's Life for Me) and was written by George Bruns with lyrics by Xavier "X" Atencio. It is the song heard throughout the attraction Pirates of the Caribbean in Disneyland and Magic Kingdom.

Marketing and release
The first teaser trailer was attached to The Lord of the Rings: The Two Towers while the theatrical trailer debuted in front of Anger Management and Disney’s Holes.

RatingPirates of the Caribbean was the first film released under the Walt Disney Pictures banner to be rated PG-13 by the MPAA; one executive noted that she found the film too intense for her five-year-old child. Nonetheless, the studio was confident enough to add The Curse of the Black Pearl subtitle to the film in case sequels were made, and to attract older children. Verbinski disliked the new title because it is the Aztec gold rather than the ship that is cursed, so he requested the title to be unreadable on the poster.

Home media
The DVD and VHS editions of the film were released December 1, 2003, in the UK and December 2, 2003, in the US, with 11 million copies sold in the first week, a record for live action video. It earned $235 million from DVDs as of January 2004. This THX certified DVD release featured two discs, featuring three commentary tracks (Johnny Depp & Gore Verbinski; Jerry Bruckheimer, Keira Knightley & Jack Davenport; and the screenwriter team), various deleted scenes and documentaries, and a 1968 Disneyland episode about the theme park ride. A special three-disc edition was released on November 2, 2004, in the U.S. and April 25, 2005, in the UK.

A PSP release of the film followed on April 19, 2005. The high-definition Blu-ray Disc version of the film was released on May 22, 2007. This movie was also among the first to be sold at the iTunes music store. The Curse of the Black Pearl had its UK television premiere on Christmas Eve 2007 on BBC One at 20:30 and was watched by an estimated 7 million viewers.

On 2 January 2022, The Curse of the Black Pearl was released on Ultra HD Blu-ray. However, the film's remaster was criticized by various online reviewers for being upscaled from 2K resolution, excessive application of digital noise reduction and various other shortcomings. A review by Martin Liebman of Blu-ray.com compared the release unfavorably to the previous 2007 Blu-ray release, stating: "The picture's grain has been reduced to a meshy, artificial appearance, looking frozen and flat and certainly less than genuine and flattering. Edge enhancement is in evidence. Textures have been scrubbed down and sharpened back up. Details appear waxy and lacking complexity [...] This is just a real clunker of a UHD image and one of the least impressive the format has seen."

Reception
Box office
Before its release, many journalists expected Pirates of the Caribbean: The Curse of the Black Pearl to be a flop. The pirate genre had not been successful for years, with Cutthroat Island (1995) being a notable flop. The film was also based on a theme park ride, and Depp, known mostly for starring in cult films at the time, had little track record as a box-office leading man.Pirates of the Caribbean: The Curse of the Black Pearl opened at #1, grossing $46,630,690 in its opening weekend and $70,625,971 since its Wednesday launch. It eventually made its way to $654,264,015 worldwide ($305,413,918 domestically and $348,850,097 overseas), becoming the fourth-highest-grossing film of 2003. Box Office Mojo estimates that the film sold over 50.64 million tickets in the US.

Internationally it dominated for seven consecutive weekends at the box office, tying the record of Men in Black II at the time. Only three movies after that broke the record; its sequel, Dead Man's Chest, (with nine consecutive #1 weekends and ten in total), Avatar (with 11 consecutive #1 weekends) and The Smurfs (with eight consecutive #1 weekends). As of February 2021, it is the 141st-highest-grossing film of all time.

Critical response

On review aggregator Rotten Tomatoes, the film has an approval rating of 80% based on 220 reviews, and an average rating of 7.1/10. The site's critical consensus reads, "It may leave you exhausted like the theme park ride that inspired it; however, you'll have a good time when it's over." At Metacritic, which assigns a weighted average rating to reviews, the film received an average score of 63 out of 100, based on reviews from 40 critics, indicating "generally favorable reviews". Audiences polled by CinemaScore gave the film an average grade of "A" on an A+ to F scale.

Alan Morrison of Empire felt it was "the best blockbuster of the summer," acclaiming all the comic performances despite his disappointment with the swashbuckling sequences.

The performance of Johnny Depp as Jack Sparrow was particularly praised by critics and audiences alike. Review site PopMatters applauds Depp's performance by saying "Ingenious and mesmerizing, Johnny Depp embodies the film's essential fantasy, that a pirate's life is exciting and unfettered." James Berardinelli of ReelViews also applauds Depp's performance by saying "Pirates of the Caribbean belongs to Johnny Depp...Take away Depp, and you're left with a derivative and dull motion picture."

Roger Ebert acclaimed the performances of Depp and Rush, and particularly that "It can be said that [Depp's] performance is original in its every atom. There has never been a pirate, or for that matter a human being, like this in any other movie... his behavior shows a lifetime of rehearsal." However, he felt the film went on for too long, a criticism shared by Kenneth Turan's negative review, feeling it "spends far too much time on its huge supporting cast of pirates (nowhere near as entertaining as everyone assumes) and on bloated adventure set pieces," despite having also enjoyed Depp's performance. Mark Kermode described the film as "a triumph of turgid theme-park hackery over the art of cinema".

Accolades

For his performance as Captain Jack Sparrow, Johnny Depp won several awards, including Outstanding Performance by a Male Actor in a Leading Role at the 10th Screen Actors Guild Awards, Best Male Performance at the 2004 MTV Movie Awards, and Best Actor at the 9th Empire Awards. Depp was also nominated for Best Actor – Motion Picture Musical or Comedy at the 61st Golden Globe Awards, Best Actor in a Leading Role at the 57th British Academy Film Awards, and Best Actor at the 76th Academy Awards, in which The Curse of the Black Pearl also received nominations for Best Makeup, Best Sound Editing, Best Sound Mixing, and Best Visual Effects. Awards won by Curse of the Black Pearl include Best Make-up/Hair at the 57th British Academy Film Awards, Saturn Award for Best Costumes, Golden Reel Award for Sound Editing, two VES Awards for Visual Effects, and the People's Choice Award for Favorite Motion Picture.

 American Film Institute Lists
 AFI's 100 Years...100 Movies (10th Anniversary Edition) – Nominated
 AFI's 10 Top 10 – Fantasy – Nominated

Sequels

The film spun off four sequels, with the latest sequel released in 2017. The first two were back-to-back sequels in 2006 and 2007, Dead Man's Chest and At World's End, respectively. The third sequel, On Stranger Tides, was released in 2011. The fourth sequel, Dead Men Tell No Tales'', was slated to begin production in October 2014 for a summer 2016 release, but was eventually delayed to May 2017. It was directed by Joachim Rønning and Espen Sandberg. A sixth film is currently in development.

Notes

References

External links

 
 
  
 

2003 films
2003 action films
2003 comedy films
2003 fantasy films
2000s action adventure films
2000s adventure comedy films
2000s English-language films
2000s fantasy action films
2000s fantasy adventure films
2000s American films
American action adventure films
American adventure comedy films
American fantasy adventure films
BAFTA winners (films)
Films about curses
Films about undead
Films directed by Gore Verbinski
Films produced by Jerry Bruckheimer
Films scored by Klaus Badelt
Films set in Jamaica
Films set in the 1720s
Films set on ships
Films shot in Los Angeles County, California
Films shot in Saint Vincent and the Grenadines
Films with screenplays by Stuart Beattie
Films with screenplays by Ted Elliott
Films with screenplays by Terry Rossio
Films using motion capture
Pirates of the Caribbean (film series) films
Treasure hunt films
Walt Disney Pictures films